A gate is an opening in a wall or fence fitted with a moveable barrier allowing it to be closed.

Gate or GATE may also refer to:

Arts, entertainment, and media
 Gate (album), a 1995 album by Peter Frohmader
 The Gate, a 1987 horror film 
 Gate (film), a 2018 South Korean film
 Gate (novel series), a 2006/2010 novel series by Takumi Yanai, with comic (manga, 2011) and television (anime, 2015) adaptations
 Gate (solitaire), a card game
 GATE (video game), a 1991 action-adventure video game
 Gåte, a Norwegian band
 Gåte (2002 EP), by the eponymous band
 Grammy, Academy, Tony, and Emmy Awards, or "GATE Awards", see List of people who have won Academy, Emmy, Grammy, and Tony Awards

Engineering

Electronics
 Gate (transistor), terminal of a field effect transistor
 Logic gate, a functional building block in digital logic such as "and", "or", or "not"
 Metal gate, the gate material in a MOSFET transistor
 Noise gate, a high-quality audio squelch control for reducing noise
 Range gate, the area encompassed by one pixel of radar data

Equipment
 Gate, a rowing term for the hinged bar that prevents the oar from coming out
 Gate, a sprue molding channel which carries molten metal into a mold
 Gate, a sprung safety latch on a lifting hook or carabiner

Hydraulics
 Gate (hydraulic engineering), a movable structure used to control the flow of fluid in a pipe or channel
 Gate (water transport), the watertight door that seals off a chamber of a lock
 Floodgate, an adjustable gate used to control water flow in flood barriers, lake, river, stream, or levee systems
 Gate valve, a valve that opens by lifting a wedge out of the path of the fluid

Sport

 The pairs of poles through which slalom skiers aim to pass.

Enterprises and organizations
 GATE (organization), an organization working on gender identity and sex characteristics issues
 Gate Studios, a British film studio in operation from 1928 to the early 1950s
 Gate Theatre, in Dublin
 Gay Alliance Toward Equality, or "GATE", one of the first Canadian gay liberation groups
 Grupo de Ações Táticas Especiais (Portuguese for "Special Tactical Actions Group"), a Brazilian police special forces squad

Places
 Gate, Arkansas
 Gate, Oklahoma
 Gate, Washington
 Gate City, Virginia
 Gate District, St. Louis

Famous gates
Gates in Jerusalem's Old City Walls
Gates of Delhi, India
Brandenburg Gate, 18th-century neoclassical monument in Berlin
Cilician Gates or Gülek Pass, a pass through the Taurus Mountains connecting the low plains of Cilicia to the Anatolian Plateau, Turkey
Gate of Kuwait, a supertall skyscraper under construction in Kuwait City, Kuwait
Golden Gate, a strait on the west coast of North America that connects San Francisco Bay to the Pacific Ocean
India Gate, the All India War Memorial, a memorial located on the Rajpath, the eastern edge of the "ceremonial axis" of New Delhi, India
Ishtar Gate, the eighth gate to the inner city of Babylon
Lion Gate, the main entrance of the Bronze Age citadel of Mycenae, southern Greece
Menin Gate, a war memorial dedicated to the British and Commonwealth soldiers who were killed in the Ypres, Belgium during World War I
Victoria Gate (Valletta), a city gate in Valletta, Malta

Scandals and conspiracy theories
 "-gate", common suffix for a public scandal (see List of "-gate" scandals and controversies) and for conspiracy theories, such as:
 Watergate scandal, a United States scandal that lasted from 1972 to 1974, which led to the use of the suffix "-gate" for other scandals
 Gategate, a scandal in the United Kingdom involving the Government Chief Whip, the police, and a gate
 Pizzagate conspiracy theory, a debunked conspiracy theory that went viral during the 2016 United States presidential election cycle
 Russiagate, a popular name for a scandal involving Russian interference in the 2016 United States elections
 Telegramgate, a 2019 scandal involving Puerto Rico's governor Ricardo Rossello
 Partygate, a United Kingdom scandal that lasted from 2021 to 2022, involving parties held in 10 Downing Street during COVID-19 restrictions

Science and technology
 Gate (cytometry), a set of limits for data from a cytometer
 Film gate, the opening in the front of a motion picture camera
 Gallium(II) telluride, a chemical compound with the formula GaTe 
 General Architecture for Text Engineering, or "GATE", a human language processing system
 Quantum gate, a basic quantum mechanics operation that has properties of a classical logic gate

Other uses
 Gate (airport), a specified location for boarding or leaving an aircraft in an airport
 Gate (surname), people and characters with the surname
 Gate receipts (or "event gate"), the sum of ticket revenue for a particular event at a sporting venue
 Gifted education, also known as Gifted and Talented Education, or "GATE"
 Graduate Aptitude Test in Engineering, or "GATE", an entrance examination for admission to postgraduate courses in India

See also

 Báb (1819–1850), which means "Gate" and is the title taken by the founder of Bábism
 Gait (disambiguation)
 Gates (disambiguation)
 Gating (disambiguation)
 The Gate (disambiguation)